Elizabeth Pickering may refer to:

Elizabeth Creed née Pickering (1642–1728), daughter of Sir Gilbert Pickering
Elisabeth Pickering (c.1510–1562), English printer